UP Aerospace conducted its first launch on 25 September 2006 from Spaceport America in Upham, New Mexico. Since then, numerous other launches, mostly successful, have been conducted from the company's launch complex at Spaceport America. All launches of UP Aerospace have been suborbital. Future launches may include orbital vehicles as they are developed.

All launches below are sub-orbital so that they do not complete one orbital revolution. All launches below are from Spaceport America.

References

Spaceflight timelines